Liu Li (died May or June 244), courtesy name Fengxiao, was an imperial prince of the state of Shu Han in the Three Kingdoms period of China. He was a son of Liu Bei, the founding emperor of Shu, and a younger half-brother of Liu Shan, the second Shu emperor.

Life
Liu Li was born in an unknown year. His father, Liu Bei, was a warlord of the late Eastern Han dynasty who became the founding emperor of the state of Shu Han in the Three Kingdoms period. His mother was one of Liu Bei's concubines. He was a younger half-brother of Liu Shan, Liu Bei's successor and the second emperor of Shu. He was born to a different mother from Liu Yong, another half-brother of Liu Shan.

Sometime in July 221, about three months after Liu Bei became emperor, he sent Xu Jing, the Minister over the Masses, as an emissary to read out an imperial edict and grant Liu Li the title "Prince of Liang" (梁王).

In 230, during Liu Shan's reign, Liu Li's title was changed to "Prince of Anping" (安平王). He died in 244 and was honoured with the posthumous title "Prince Dao" (悼王).

Descendants
Liu Li's son, Liu Yin (劉胤), inherited his father's peerage as the Prince of Anping. He died in 256 and was honoured with the posthumous title "Prince Ai" (哀王). Liu Yin's son, Liu Cheng (劉承), became the next Prince of Anping, but died a year later in 257 and was posthumously honoured as "Prince Shang" (殤王).

Liu Li had another son, Liu Ji (劉輯), who held the title "Marquis of Wuyi" (武邑侯). In 261, Liu Shan issued an imperial edict ordering Liu Ji to succeed his nephew Liu Cheng as the next Prince of Anping. In 264, one year after Shu was conquered by its rival state, Wei, Liu Ji moved to Luoyang, the Wei imperial capital. The Wei government appointed him as a Commandant of Equipage (奉車都尉) and enfeoffed him as a district marquis (鄉侯).

See also
 Lists of people of the Three Kingdoms
 Shu Han family trees

Notes

References

 Chen, Shou (3rd century). Records of the Three Kingdoms (Sanguozhi).
 

Shu Han imperial princes
Family of Liu Bei
Year of birth unknown
244 deaths